Enoch Arden is a 1914 British silent drama film directed by Percy Nash and starring Gerald Lawrence, Fay Davis and Ben Webster. It was based on the 1864 poem Enoch Arden by Alfred, Lord Tennyson.

Cast
 Gerald Lawrence - Enoch Arden
 Fay Davis - Annie Lee
 Ben Webster - Philip Ray
 Dame May Whitty - Miriam Lane
 Gregory Scott - Charles
 John Marlborough East - John Lane
 Douglas Payne - The Priest
 Joan Ritz
 Douglas Cox

References

External links

1914 films
1914 drama films
British silent feature films
Films directed by Percy Nash
Films based on Enoch Arden
British drama films
British black-and-white films
1910s English-language films
1910s British films
Silent drama films